Dratch is a surname. Notable people with the surname include:

Mark Dratch, American rabbi and the founder of JSafe
Rachel Dratch (born 1966), American actress, comedian, and writer

See also
Drach